Chalossian is an industry of flint tools from the Stone Age. Paul Bovier-Lapierre discovered it in Egypt.

References

Lower Paleolithic Archaeological cultures of Africa